Niestetal is a municipality in the district of Kassel, in Hesse, Germany. It is situated on the eastern bank of the Fulda, 4 km east of Kassel (centre).

References

Kassel (district)